Lieutenant General Joseph Richard Inge (born August 20, 1947) is a retired officer of the United States Army. He served as Deputy Commander, United States Northern Command, and Vice Commander, United States Element, North American Aerospace Defense Command, headquartered at Peterson Air Force Base, Colorado in 2007. He retired in 2007, after a 38-year career.

As Deputy Commander, United States Northern Command, Inge helped lead the command responsible to deter, prevent and defeat threats and aggression aimed at the United States, its territories and interests within the assigned area of responsibility and, as directed by the President or Secretary of Defense, provide defense support of civil authorities including consequence management operations.

Youth and education
Joseph Richard Inge was born on August 20, 1947, in Chase City, Virginia. He was commissioned a second lieutenant of Armor and awarded a Bachelor of Science in Agriculture upon graduation from Virginia Polytechnic Institute and its Army ROTC program on June 4, 1969. He holds a Master of Arts in Personnel Management and Administration from Central Michigan University. His military education includes the Armor Basic and Advanced Courses, the Army Command and General Staff College, and the United States Army War College.

Army career
Between April 1970 and June 1975, Inge served as a Company Commander in the 33rd Armor, 3rd Armored Division in Germany and the 73rd Armor, 2nd Infantry Division in Korea.

From June 1976 to March 1978, Inge served as Area Commander of the Jacksonville, Florida Recruiting District. He then transferred to Alexandria, Virginia to serve as Assignment Officer, Armor Branch Captains, for the United States Army Military Personnel Center until July 1980. He returned to Germany in June 1981 to serve as battalion and then brigade Executive Officer for elements of the 3rd Infantry Division. In March 1984 he was assigned as a battalion commander in the 64th Armor, 3rd Infantry Division in Germany.

From June 1987 to April 1991, Inge held several positions in Washington, D.C., including Executive Officer, Technology Management Office, Office of the Chief of Staff, Army; Executive Officer to the Director of the Army Staff, Office of the Chief of Staff, Army; and Executive Officer to the Assistant Secretary of the Army for Installations, Logistics and Environment. In April 1991 he was appointed a Brigade Commander in the 1st Cavalry Division at Fort Hood, Texas. Following this assignment he served as Chief of Staff, United StatesArmy Combined Arms Center, Fort Leavenworth, Kansas from May 1993 to September 1993. He then returned to Washington, D.C. to serve as Executive Assistant to the Chairman of the Joint Chiefs of Staff in Washington, D.C. until August 1995.

Following this assignment, Inge was named Assistant Division Commander (Support) of the 3rd Infantry Division (Mechanized) at Fort Stewart, Georgia, where he served until July 1996. He then returned to Kansas to serve as the Deputy Commandant of the U.S. Army Command and General Staff College. In August 1998 Inge was selected as Commanding General of United States Army, Japan/9th Theater Support Command. He served in this position until June 2000, when he was appointed Deputy, The Inspector General, Office of the Secretary of the Army, in Washington, D.C. In October 2001, Inge became commander of First United States Army, Fort Gillem, Georgia. In June 2004 he was confirmed as Deputy Commander, United States Northern Command, and Vice Commander, United States Element, North American Aerospace Defense Command.

Inge retired from active duty after 38 years of service in 2007.

Awards and decorations
  Basic Parachutist Badge
  Special Forces Tab
  Ranger Tab
  Office of the Joint Chiefs of Staff Identification Badge
  Army Staff Identification Badge
  USNORTHCOM Combat Service Identification Badge
  64th Armor Regiment Distinctive Unit Insignia
 Army Distinguished Service Medal with one bronze oak leaf cluster
  Defense Superior Service Medal
  Legion of Merit with three oak leaf clusters
  Meritorious Service Medal with three oak leaf clusters
  Army Commendation Medal with oak leaf cluster
  Army Achievement Medal with oak leaf cluster
  Joint Meritorious Unit Award
  Army Superior Unit Award
  National Defense Service Medal with two bronze service stars
  Southwest Asia Service Medal with service star
  Army Service Ribbon
  Army Overseas Service Ribbon with bronze award numeral 4
  Order of the Sacred Treasure, Japan (2nd class)
  Kuwait Liberation Medal (Kuwait)

References

Living people
Recipients of the Distinguished Service Medal (US Army)
Recipients of the Legion of Merit
United States Army generals
Virginia Tech alumni
Central Michigan University alumni
1947 births
United States Army Command and General Staff College alumni
United States Army War College alumni
People from Chase City, Virginia
Recipients of the Defense Superior Service Medal